Rovdino is the name of several rural localities in Russia:
Rovdino, Arkhangelsk Oblast, a selo in Rovdinsky Selsoviet of Shenkursky District of Arkhangelsk Oblast
Rovdino, Vologda Oblast, a village in Nizhneyerogodsky Selsoviet of Velikoustyugsky District of Vologda Oblast